Tobias Truvillion (born October 1, 1975) is an American actor.

Career

In 2006, he received his first major role on ABC series One Life to Live, playing Vincent Jones. He is also known for his roles on Empire (2016–17) and In Contempt (2018).

Filmography

Film/Movie

Television

Music videos

Awards and nominations

References

External links
Official website

1975 births
American male soap opera actors
Living people
Bayside High School (Queens) alumni